Mexico sent a delegation to compete at the 1992 Summer Paralympics in Barcelona, Spain. Its athletes finished forty-sixth in the overall medal count.

Medalists

See also 
 1992 Summer Paralympics
 Mexico at the 1992 Summer Olympics

References 

Nations at the 1992 Summer Paralympics
1992
Summer Paralympics